The Ark was a bioshelter constructed in Spry Point, Prince Edward Island, designed by architects David Bergmark and Ole Hammarlund, incorporating sustainable architecture technologies developed by the New Alchemy Institute. Construction began in 1975 and was completed in 1976.

Bergmark's family lived in the Ark for about 18 months from its opening in 1976, demonstrating its potential as a residential structure. It was then used for research in alternative energy by the government of Prince Edward Island. Over the next decade it was used for various community and commercial activities, including a motel, before being sold and converted to a restaurant in 1991. The restaurant was sold in the late 1990s and the building was demolished.

Today, the Inn at Spry Point stands on the former site of the Ark.

Further reading

References

External links 
PEI Ark Catalogue

Buildings and structures in Kings County, Prince Edward Island
Residential buildings completed in 1976
Demolished buildings and structures in Canada
Sustainable buildings in Canada